Terribly Stuck Up is a 1915 American short comedy film featuring Harold Lloyd.

Cast
 Harold Lloyd - Lonesome Luke
 Gene Marsh
 Jack Spinks

See also
 Harold Lloyd filmography

References

External links

1915 films
American silent short films
1915 comedy films
American black-and-white films
Films directed by Hal Roach
1915 short films
Silent American comedy films
Lonesome Luke films
American comedy short films
1910s American films